Portrait of a Young Senator is an oil on panel painting by Giovanni Bellini, dating to 1490–1500 and now in the Uffizi Gallery in Florence.

It was first recorded in a 1753 inventory as a self-portrait of the painter, based solely on the resemblance of a few elements to the confirmed self-portrait in the Galleria Capitolina. To date it, some have suggested comparisons with other portraits of young men by the artist, such as those in the Royal Collection and the Walker Art Gallery.

References

Young Senator
Paintings in the collection of the Uffizi
Young Senator